Marcelo Agustín Miño (born 21 August 1997) is an Argentine professional footballer who plays as a goalkeeper for Ferro Carril Oeste, on loan from Rosario Central.

Career

Club
Atlético Guatimozín and Arias Foot Ball Club were youth teams of Miño, prior to him signing with Vélez Sarsfield and subsequently Rosario Central. He was first chosen in a senior matchday squad in April 2018, when manager Leonardo Fernández selected the goalkeeper on the substitutes bench for an Argentine Primera División victory over Patronato. After his breakthrough in 2017–18, Miño made his professional debut in 2018–19 during a fixture with former club Vélez Sarsfield on 3 December 2018.

On 11 March 2021, Miño joined Primera Nacional club Ferro Carril Oeste on a loan deal for the rest of 2022. On 6 January 2022, the loan spell was extended for one further year.

International
Miño represented Argentina at the 2017 FIFA U-20 World Cup in South Korea; winning one cap in his nation's final Group A match against Guinea on 26 May.

Career statistics
.

References

External links

1997 births
Living people
Sportspeople from Córdoba Province, Argentina
Argentine footballers
Argentina youth international footballers
Argentina under-20 international footballers
Association football goalkeepers
Argentine Primera División players
Primera Nacional players
Rosario Central footballers
Ferro Carril Oeste footballers